Sir Humphrey Orme Clarke, 5th Baronet (6 July 1906, in London, United Kingdom – 22 January 1973, in Bibury, Gloucestershire), was the son of Sir Orme Bigland Clarke, 4th Baronet and Elfrida Roosevelt. He was educated at Eton College and Christ Church, Oxford. He was Captain of the Oppidans at Eton College.

He married secondly (1 September 1938) Elisabeth Irene Cook Clarke, daughter of Dr. William Alexander Cook, who was the mother of Humphrey's heir: Sir Toby Clarke, 6th Baronet.
He died on 22 January 1973 at the age of 66.
    
Sir Humphrey was with the British Embassy in Washington between 1941 and 1944. He was with the Foreign Office between 1944 and 1946. He succeeded to the title of 5th Baronet Clarke, of Dunham Lodge, co. Norfolk (UK, 1831) on 31 March 1949.

He was first cousin, twice removed from U.S. President Theodore Roosevelt and second cousin, twice removed from President Franklin D. Roosevelt through his mother Elfrida Roosevelt. His great-grandfathers were James Alfred Roosevelt, a prominent member of the Roosevelt family, and Augustus Lowell, a member of the successful Lowell family.

References

Sources
Greenslet, Ferris. (1946) The Lowells and Their Seven Worlds, Boston: Houghton Mifflin. .

1906 births
1973 deaths
Baronets in the Baronetage of the United Kingdom
People educated at Eton College
English people of American descent
English people of Dutch descent
Roosevelt family
Schuyler family
Clarke baronets